Twilight Time is a 1982 drama film directed by Goran Paskaljević, written by Goran Paskaljevic, Filip David, Dan Tana and Rowland Barber, and starring Karl Malden, Jodi Thelen, Damien Nash, Mia Roth, Pavle Vuisić, Dragan Maksimović and Stole Aranđelović. It was released in the United States on February 13, 1983, by United Artists.

Premise
An elderly man, returning to Yugoslavia after 20 years in America, is saddled with the upbringing of his two grandchildren in a small farming village.

Cast 

Karl Malden as Marko Sekulovic
Jodi Thelen as Lana
Damien Nash as Ivan
Mia Roth as Ana
Pavle Vuisić as Pashko
Dragan Maksimović as Tony
Stole Aranđelović as Matan
Petar Božović as Rocky
Milan Srdoč as Karlo
Peter Carsten as Factory Gateman
Bora Todorović as Nikola
Božidar Pavićević as Luka 
Davor Antolić as Driver
Vladan Živković as First Worker
Ratko Miletić as Second Worker
Obren Helcer as Peter's Father
Slobodanka Marković as Kristina
Ethan Stone as Milan
Bojana Stanković as Vera
Izabela Gavrić as Helena
Predrag Dejanović as Vlatko
Nenad Dejanović as Vladimir
Branislav Ranisavljev as Aldo

References

External links 
 

1982 films
1982 drama films
American drama films
Films about old age
Films directed by Goran Paskaljević
Films scored by Walter Scharf
Films set in Yugoslavia
Films shot in Yugoslavia
Metro-Goldwyn-Mayer films
United Artists films
Yugoslav drama films
1980s English-language films
1980s American films
English-language Yugoslav films